The Millbrook First Nation is a Mi'kmaq First Nation band government in Nova Scotia, Canada.

Reserves
Millbook First Nation has seven reserves:

Band Chiefs

Notable residents
 Activist Nora Bernard was a member of Millbrook.
 Former long-serving Band chief Lawrence Paul

References

External links
Millbrook First Nation website

First Nations governments in Atlantic Canada
First Nations in Nova Scotia
Mi'kmaq governments
Communities in Halifax County, Nova Scotia
Communities in Colchester County